Scars is the second studio album by American rock band Soil. It was released on September 11, 2001, via J Records. Although the band's second album, it was their first major label release and proved to be their most commercially successful. Its popular single, "Halo", effectively launched the band into mainstream exposure. Scars was the first rock album released through J Records.

Background and recording
After the release of Soil's first album, Throttle Junkies, MIA Records closed. The band started writing new material and, with the help of Johnny K, fleshed out several tracks. A three-song demo of "My Own", "Need to Feel" and "Halo" was recorded in three days of August 2000 and was plugged on the Demo Diaries website. "Halo", with its aggressive hook, gained the attention of the radio programmer Pat Lynch of Orlando, Florida, and he gave the song considerable exposure on his active rock station WJRR. Within months, it became the station's most requested song and caught the attention of various major labels. In March 2001, after visiting four potential candidates (RCA, J, Elektra, Warner Bros), Soil became the first rock band signed to J Records who soon offered Orlando fans a free Soil sampler. At this point, Soil had already recorded more than enough material for an album and were eager to begin work on what became Scars. The music industry legend, Clive Davis, responsible for signing such acts as Pink Floyd and Bruce Springsteen, signed the band, and stated that "you're gonna be my only rock band for now. You're going to be a priority, and I want to break this band."

Bass guitarist Tim King noted how quickly J Records moved to maintain the momentum provided by WJRR: "Everything just fell into place so fast. What normally takes three months, we did in about three weeks. I have to say, J Records stepped up to the plate and did it like they had three months. It's amazing how professional and how hard working they are and what they did to get everything moving."

The band originally had 28 songs which were narrowed to 18 or 20 for pre-production. After further narrowing them down to about 15 or 20, votes were taken to decide a final track list. Two of the three initial demo tracks were simply remixed while "My Own" was left untouched. Two outtakes, "Damaged You" and "Center", were recorded during the Scars sessions and the band expressed hopes of seeing them possibly released on soundtracks. The song "Center" appeared on the Japanese version of the album and both tracks were included on the digital 10th anniversary re-release of Scars in 2011.

Music and lyrics
Scars has an array of bleak lyrics often dealing with personal troubles. The vocalist, Ryan McCombs, noted, "All the lyrics that I write are about things that I've experienced in life. All the songs really touch home for me personally." He added that some songs proved difficult to perform in concert because of their intimate nature. A particular shift in both lyrics and tone is shown in "The One", an anxious, up tempo plea for the mending of an old friendship. McCombs described the lyrical meaning behind "Unreal" as "the amount of control, or better, the lack of control one seems to have over his/her own life at times... and the feeling that maybe there is a higher power out there and if there is, he clearly doesn't give a fuck about me now or the times you seem to need a little help the most."

McCombs explained the meaning of the album title in a 2001 interview: "It means what it says. It's just scars. [...] The title, to me, encompasses the entire album. Each song as an individual is a scar on the psyche or mentally and emotionally. I think the title really fits the whole body of work."

Touring and promotion
Soil began touring in August 2001 to promote Scars. They were scheduled to perform at The Metro in Chicago on the date of the album's release, but this was rescheduled because of the September 11 terrorist attacks in New York. Soil took part in the Merry Mayhem tour with Ozzy Osbourne, Rob Zombie, and Mudvayne in late 2001. They began 2002 by touring with Soulfly, Static-X and Onesidezero in the US. That spring, Soil went to Europe with Adema before joining Sevendust for five weeks. They performed as a Second Stage act on Ozzfest 2002 where Zakk Wylde performed "Halo" with the band.

Soil's second album gave the band a foothold in the mainstream scene with the singles "Halo" and "Unreal". Both songs had music videos which were shown on MTV2 and MMUSA. The lead single's video depicts the band performing in a rundown house filled with youngsters dancing to the song. The crumbling, dust filled house is lit primarily by lamps and sunlight piercing through the boarded up windows. Band members are seen walking across the walls and ceiling and breaking their instruments - including a metal cymbal - through the sheer violence of their performance.

The video for the band's second single, "Unreal", was directed by Marc Webb. The bleak lyrics depict rage and betrayal and were shot in what the guitarist Adam Zadel described as an "old, decrepit looking" Los Angeles alley with "a bunch of dirty kids everywhere". A bright light and fog flood the alley to create a washed-out atmosphere among fans rapidly waving large flags. The video also makes use of corroded film effects.

In the fall of 2011, seven years after the departure of the vocalist Ryan McCombs, Soil reunited with their original lead singer for the Scars 10th Anniversary Tour with Puddle of Mudd in the United Kingdom. A 10th anniversary edition of Scars was also released digitally through Sony Music on October 10, 2011. This includes two bonus tracks recorded during the Scars sessions.

Reception

Commercial success
The album and its first two singles entered charts in both the US and UK. "Halo" found its way to the Active Rock Top 20 while "Unreal" was a most-added track at Active Rock on release. Around its tenth anniversary in 2011, the album gained Silver status in the UK. Scars was Soil's most successful release.

Critical response

Scars received broad approval from critics for its modern flair yet avoidance of nu metal mimicry. Awarding 3 out of 5 stars, AllMusic's Jason D. Taylor called Scars a "straight-up rock & roll album,  with a modern twist." He added that despite "evident commercial appeal," the songs have a "refreshing coarse grittiness" among typical radio singles. Taylor summed up by commenting, "Soil may not appeal to those looking for the latest in hip-hop/metal, but for those wishing a band would come along who could induce the feelings that Appetite for Destruction or Metallica's Black album once did, Scars is for you."

Borivoj Krgin of Blabbermouth.net called Scars "an impressive album that deserves to be heard" among the dominating "sugar-coated brand of pimprock and more eclectic form of nu-metal." He regarded the album as a continuation of the sound first heard on Throttle Junkies, only with a "more streamlined, focused" and consequently more commercial approach. He added, "the material is consistently strong, if not all-out amazing" and praised the guitar work of Shaun Glass and Adam Zadel as well as the "throaty delivery" of Ryan McCombs for dropping its blatant Layne Staley inspiration.

In a brief review, Bill Ribas of NY Rock praised Clive Davis' choice for J Records' first heavy metal band and compared McCombs' voice to "a cross between Rob Zombie and an angry Eddie Vedder."

Scars was named Metal Hammer Album of the Year for 2002. It also received praise from the likes of Entertainment Weekly, CMJ, Revolver and Metal Edge.

Track listing

Personnel
 Ryan McCombs – vocals
 Adam Zadel – guitar, backing vocals
 Shaun Glass – guitar
 Tim King- bass guitar
 Tom Schofield – drums
 Johnny K – producer
 Cladius Mittendrofer – assistant mix engineer
 George Marino – mastering
 James Diener – A&R

Charts

Album

Singles

Certifications

References

External links
 
 

2001 albums
Soil (American band) albums
J Records albums